The 2017 Women's EuroHockey Championship II was the 7th edition of the Women's EuroHockey Championship II. It was held from the 6th until the 12th of August 2017 in Cardiff, Wales. The tournament will also serve as a direct qualifier for the 2019 EuroHockey Championship, with the winner Belarus and runner-up Russia qualifying.

Qualified teams

Format
The eight teams will be split into two groups of four teams. The top two teams from each pool advance to the semifinals to determine the winner in a knockout system. The bottom two teams from each pool play in a new group with the teams they did not play against in the group stage. The last team will be relegated to the EuroHockey Championship III.

Results
All times are local (UTC+0).

Preliminary round

Pool A

Pool B

Fifth to eighth place classification

Pool C
The points obtained in the preliminary round against the other team are taken over.

First to fourth place classification

Semi-finals

Third and fourth place

Final

Final standings

See also
2017 Men's EuroHockey Championship II
2017 Women's EuroHockey Championship III
2017 Women's EuroHockey Nations Championship

References

Women's EuroHockey Championship II
EuroHockey Championship II
2010s in Cardiff
Sports competitions in Cardiff
International women's field hockey competitions hosted by Wales
EuroHockey Championship II Women
Women 2